The 2007 Dickies 500 was the 34th race in the 2007 NASCAR Nextel Cup season and the third to last race in the 2007 Chase for the Nextel Cup.  This race took place on Sunday, November 4, at Texas Motor Speedway in Fort Worth, Texas.

Background

Qualifying
With a fast lap at 27.964 sec. at a speed of 193.105 mph, Chase driver Martin Truex Jr. won his first career pole. On his outside will be points leader Jeff Gordon. Defending race winner Tony Stewart rolls off 15th, defending champion Jimmie Johnson starts 8th, and darkhorse candidate Clint Bowyer starts 29th. Of note, open wheel imports Juan Pablo Montoya and A. J. Allmendinger will roll of 3rd and 5th, a personal best for Allmendinger, and second best for Montoya. Truex also becomes the 17th different driver to win a pole, tying a record originally set in the 1997 season and matched in the 2001 season.

Failed to Qualify: #4-Ward Burton, #49-John Andretti, #55-Michael Waltrip, #08-Burney Lamar, #34-Kevin Lepage.

Race
The race would mostly be dominated by Kyle Busch, who led for 153 laps. Chase drivers such as Jeff Burton, Kevin Harvick, Kurt Busch, Matt Kenseth, Denny Hamlin, and Truex saw their hopes for title contention end. On the final pit stop Robbie Reiser, Kenseth's crew chief, called his pit crew to only change two tires. This got them the track position, but not very many cars followed their strategy. One of those cars was of Jimmie Johnson. With four fresh tires, Jimmie hunted down Kenseth and the two of them staged a brilliant and intense duel, staying side by side for more than a lap. Johnson would eventually prevail with two to go and take his third consecutive win and take the points lead away from teammate Jeff Gordon.

Nine drivers in the Chase for the NEXTEL Cup finished in the top 11 of the overall running order.

Results

Points
As mentioned above, Johnson took over the points lead, 30 points ahead of Gordon.  Ironically, if the system that NASCAR used before the Chase started (1975-2003) was still in use, Gordon would have clinched the title after this race.
For the last guaranteed spot in each race, the 22 team (Bill Davis Racing) expanded its lead over the 21 team (Wood Brothers/JTG Racing) to 127 points.  Bill Elliott crashed out of the race, not helping the latter team's chances.

Other note
Johnson won his third consecutive race; he has the last two such streaks.  He also won three straight in the 2004 season (Charlotte, Martinsville, and Atlanta).

References

External links
Complete race results 
Complete owners' standings 

Dickies 500
Dickies 500
21st century in Fort Worth, Texas
NASCAR races at Texas Motor Speedway
November 2007 sports events in the United States